Heinitzburg (originally Heynitzburg, Heinitz' castle) is one of the three castles in Windhoek, Namibia. It was built in 1914 by architect Wilhelm Sander.

Sander originally built the castle for himself but sold it in 1916 to Hans Bogislav Graf von Schwerin, who named the castle Heynitzburg after his wife Margarete's birth name "von Heynitz".

Heinitzburg is used today as a restaurant and hotel. The hotel is a member of the Relais & Chateaux group, a global consortium of individually owned and operated luxury hotels.

See also 
 Sanderburg
 Schwerinsburg

External links 
 Heinitzburg Hotel

References

1914 establishments in German South West Africa
Buildings and structures in Windhoek
Castles in Namibia